Baybeats is an annual 3-day alternative music festival organized by Esplanade, and held in Singapore. It showcases various local acts such as regional and international artists. The festival is located at Esplanade - Theatres on the Bay and is 100% free and non-ticketed.

The 3 main performing stages include the Baybeats Arena (Outdoor Theatre), Powerhouse Stage (The Edge) and the Chillout Stage (Concourse). Additionally, there is a series of magazine-style interview sessions at the Observation Deck (Library@Esplanade).

Baybeats was launched in 2002 by John Chiong (WMUM) primarily to create a platform to showcase indie-rock musicians in Asia, especially local musicians, and to expose Singapore audiences to quality acts in the genre. Esplanade saw a gap in the market in terms of platforms for indie musicians to perform at and the need to satisfy the audience's needs for this kind of music, which no other commercial presenter was bringing into Singapore at that time. The festival provides opportunities for youths and the music community to participate and enjoy their own music at low cost – musicians, writers, photographers, designers as well as fans. The festival has been recognized as a launchpad for local indie talents and plays an instrumental role in the development of these bands. With a discerning selection of performances from diverse Asian countries and a wide spectrum of alternative music, the festival is starting to attract international musicians by offering Baybeats as the essential destination to experience indie music in Asia.

2008
29 to 31 August 2008.

To do justice to the diverse range of sounds showcased in Baybeats, performance locations were carefully selected to best enhance the audience experience. The Chillout Stage located at Esplanade’s Concourse was designed to profile more intimate performances such as electronic music and DJ sets. Esplanade’s redeveloped Outdoor Theatre (2.5 times larger than before) was and will be a key staple of the festival with performances held there on all three days of Baybeats.

Film screenings were also held for the first time at Baybeats. Local music and film are celebrated with a showcase of five local short films – each dealing with both subjects – by some of Singapore’s best award-winning filmmakers. Directed by Royston Tan,
Kenny Tan, Tania Sng and Yee Chang Kang, some of the shorts also featured a cast of artists from the local music scene such as Vivian Wang from The Observatory and Ginette Chittick from Astreal. All the films were screened at the Observation Deck (library@esplanade).

The line-up included Another Epic Story, The Shine and Shine and Shine and Shine (Taiwan), Force Vomit, Typecast (The Philippines), Silhouette, Cardinal Avenue, Faspitch (The Philippines), Electrico, Joy Electric (USA), Morning Utopia, Abuse The Youth (Thailand), Sourgrapes, Jebediah (Australia), Caracal, Lilac Saints, Leeson, Peepshow, The Otherside Orchestra (Malaysia), Vertical Rush, Midnight Marvel, Deserters (Malaysia), You And Whose Army?, The Oddfellows, The Lucksmiths (Australia), Agrikulture (Indonesia), Anna Judge April, The Oslo Castaways, Elemental Gaze (Indonesia), My Little Airport (Hong Kong), Transition (UK), The Analog Girl, 4imaginaryboys, The Karl Maka, diseased music, Amberhaze.

2009
28 to 30 August 2009.

To encourage local and international artists to deepen their engagement with each other, there were several collaborations between local indie bands and international musicians. Kevin Mathews(Watchmen), Desmond Sim (Lilac Saints), Eugene Wee (Lilac Saints) and Alexius Cai (Lilac Saints) played with Chris Collingwood (Fountains of Wayne) whilst Brian Koh and Mark Cheng from Leeson performed with Ally Kerr from Scotland.

Besides international names like Chris Collingwood and Anberlin from USA, this year's festival also featured a variety of bands to cater to the different alternative music tastes. From the folk-pop sounds of Scottish singer-songwriter Ally Kerr to the glamrock music of Hong Kong's Velvette Vendetta and electronic beats from RNRM of Indonesia, the line-up was an exciting weekend for fans of indie bands as they got to enjoy the unique soundscape of the global alternative music scene, for free!

The line-up included West Grand Boulevard, Exdee, Homogenic (Indonesia), Ally Kerr (UK), Barricade, Calerway (Australia), Estranged (Malaysia), The Great Spy Experiment, For This Cycle, Suicide Solution, In Each Hand A Cutlass, The Marilyns, Taken By Cars (Philippines), Chris Collingwood (USA), Flawed Element, Tabasco (Thailand), Meza Virs, Love Me Butch (Malaysia), Opposition Party, Dualtone, RNRM (Indonesia), Audiocean, Anberlin (USA), Lunar Node, Jon Chan, Silent Scenery (Malaysia), For Better Endings, Velvette Vendeatta (Hong Kong), Zero Sequence, The Ambassadors (Philippines), Nigel Hogan, Inch Chua.

2010
20 to 22 August 2010.

Featuring over 50 free performances by 36 acts from Singapore, Malaysia, Thailand, The Philippines, Indonesia, China/Hong Kong, Brazil, Canada, and USA, it attracted over 70, 000 audiences over the three days.

Amongst the 36 acts from nine countries that performed at Baybeats 2010, there were two husband-and-wife duos featured at the festival for the first time! They are Mixhell (Brazil), a DJ duo comprising founding-drummer of Brazilian seminal thrash metal band Sepultura, Iggor Cavalera and his wife, Laima Layton, and Handsome Furs (Canada), an electro punk duo made up of Dan Boeckner, frontman and vocalist of popular indie rock band Wolf Parade, and his wife Alexei Perry.

The line-up for 2010 included Fishtank, Trella, Car Crash hearts (Malaysia), Typewriter, Jon Auer of The Posies (US), Cockpit, The Standards (Thailand), Duxton Plains, Rudra, Techy Romantics (The Philippines), Carlos Castano (The Philippines), Santamonica (Indonesia), Run Neon Tiger, Basement in My Loft, The Camerawalls (The Philippines), Suchness, 4imaginaryboys, An Honest Mistake (Malaysia), Lunarin, Chicosci (The Philippines), Meltgsnow, King Ly Chee (Hong Kong), Elektone, de...connector (Thailand), David Choi (US), Postbox, Kyoto Protocol (Malaysia), Modern Children (Hong Kong), Handsome Furs (Canada), The Zozi, Hedgehog (China), The Brandals (Indonesia), Mixhell (Brazil), Celina Foo and Prema Yin (Malaysia)

2011
19 to 21 August 2011.

As with previous years, the festival line-up for 2011 embraces genres across the alternative music spectrum and includes a wide variety of subgenres of rock and pop. The acts range from established popular bands to cutting-edge up-and-coming outfits.

In addition to the Baybeats Auditions where nine local bands were selected to go through a four-month long mentoring session with Eddino Hadi, Suhaimi Subandie, Mike See and Patrick Chng, the festival also continued with the highly popular Budding Photographers Mentorship Programme facilitated by Aloysius Lim. A new initiative was also created to groom young music journalists. 8 talented Esplanade Youths go through a 4-month long mentorship with veteran musician, writer and academic Kevin Mathews, to create the Baybeats Buzz articles profiling bands as well as documenting the festival behind-the-scenes.

The line-up for 2011 included Arajua, Noughts and Exes (Hong Kong), Caracal, Apartmentkhunpa (Thailand), We The Thousands, Ruins & Remains, The Dirt Radicals, The Guilt, Reza Salleh (Malaysia), Like Silver (Malaysia), Riot !n Magenta, Bangkutaman (Indonesia), Turbo Goth (The Philippines), Cheating Sons, Furniture (Malaysia), Pet Conspiracy (China), Bear Culture, You & I Collide, Moscow Olympics (The Philippines), Buddhistson (Japan), Opposition Party, Tenderfist (Malaysia), Charles J Tan, Hollywood Nobody (Indonesia), Seyra, The Rejeks, Protocol Afro (Indonesia), Error 99 (Thailand), My Writes, Kate of Kale, Wolfgang (The Philippines), Ossuary, Nicholas Chim, and Julianne (The Philippines).

2012
29 to 31 June 2012.

This was the first year where Baybeats is now held in June instead of August.

21 local acts were featured which includes ANECHOIS, Black Diamond Folds, King Kong Jane, Obedient Wives Club, For This Cycle, Godzilla, Rudra, Rachael Teo, Cashew Chemists, The Fast Colors, Embrace Them Ghosts, The Great Spy Experiment, Plainsunset, Deon, MONSTER CAT, Pep Talk, Inch Chua & Metric System, Run Neon Tiger, Cockpit, A Town In Fear & In Each Hand a Cutlass.
Regional bands included Mocca (Indonesia), Darren Ashley (Malaysia), The Trees & The Wild (Indonesia), START OF THE DAY (Japan), STARS AND RABBIT (Indonesia), URBANDUB (The Philippines), PLOT (Thailand), Copy Machine (Korea),  Love Me Butch (Malaysia) and King Ly Chee (Hong Kong), amongst many others.

2013
28 to 30 June 2013.

Baybeats 2013 presented 35 bands (21 acts from Singapore and 14 from Malaysia, the Philippines, Indonesia, Thailand, Korea, Taiwan, Japan and Australia), with 30 bands that played at Baybeats for the first time. A new Budding Entrepreneur programme was also introduced, where a social enterprise project will be able to set up a booth at Baybeats Festival Village. The first Budding Entrepreneur was Blessings In A Bag.

The line-up for 2013 included: 7nightsatsea, Asian Chairshot (Korea), A Vacant Affair, Busco (Malaysia), Dropbeat Heartbeat, Dyeth, Enesya, Electrico, Esther Lowless, Flawed Element, Force Vomit, Frida (Australia), Froya (Malaysia), Hightime Rebellion (Indonesia), Incarnation (Malaysia), L‘Alphalpha (Indonesia), Mannequins, Monsters in Living Flesh, Modulogeek (Philippines), Nothing To Declare (Japan), Overthrown, Pastelpower, Priceless Stupid Box (Malaysia), Save Me Hollywood (Philippines), Sloppy Joe (Japan), Tall Mountains, These Brittle Bones, The Pinholes, The Psalms, The Sets Band, Windmill (Taiwan), withyouathome (Thailand), Wormrot and YouthWreck.

2014
27 to 29 June 2014.

Baybeats 2014 added a new Budding Programmes to the event - Video Artists. Video Artists were Final-year LASALLE Diploma in Broadcast Media students producing music videos for selected Budding Bands.

The Budding Entrepreneur was Project Overturned Closet (POTC).

2014's Baybeats line-up saw more bands with a wider range of music genres. They included: .gif, Aspectrum, Atlas, Attention! The New Portsdown, Bani Hidir, Deon, Earthmover (Philippines), Enec.e, Fall of Mirra, Fall To Fly (Macau), False Plaintiff, Giants Must Fall, Inch, Insight, Lightcraft (Indonesia), Jaime Wong, Lost Weekend, Monster Cat, ORANGECOVE, Pitch Feather, Pixel Apartment, Seringai (Indonesia), Spacedays, Sphaeras, SSIGHBORGGG (Korea), Stopgap, Straight Forward, Subculture (Malaysia), "Survive, Said the Prophet" (Japan), The Full Pledge Munkees, Two Million Thanks (Thailand), The Livid Sun, They Will Kill Us All (Malaysia), Villes, Whilethekidsaresurreal and wyd:syd.

See also

List of electronic music festivals
Live electronic music

References

External links

Official Site
Esplanade Site
Official Twitter

Electronic music festivals in Singapore